Patricia Lynette Dudgeon  (born 13 March 1959), usually known as Pat Dudgeon, is an Aboriginal Australian psychologist, Fellow of the Australian Psychological Society and a research professor at the University of Western Australia's (UWA) School of Indigenous Studies. Her area of research includes Indigenous social and emotional wellbeing and suicide prevention. She is actively involved with the Aboriginal community, having an ongoing commitment to social justice for Indigenous people. Dudgeon has participated in numerous state and national committees, councils, task groups and community service activities in both a voluntary and professional capacity.

Career 
Dudgeon studied at the Western Australian Institute of Technology, Curtin University and Murdoch University, graduating with BAppSc, GDip (Psych) and Doctor of Philosophy (Psychology).

Dudgeon has been a prominent and influential member of the psychology profession since graduating in 1985 as Australia's first Indigenous psychologist. She was the first Indigenous convenor of the Australian Psychological Society (APS) Interest Group on Aboriginal Issues, People and Psychology, and the founding Chair of the Australian Indigenous Psychologists Association and remains a committee member.

Before joining the University of Western Australia in 2007, Dudgeon was the Head of the Centre for Aboriginal Studies at Curtin University for 19 years, leading the field in providing culturally appropriate education.

Since 2007 she has been a Research Professor in the School of Indigenous Studies at UWA and the Director of the Centre of Best Practice in Aboriginal and Torres Strait Islander Suicide Prevention at the Poche Centre for Indigenous Health at UWA. She is Lead Chief Investigator of a Million Minds Grant, Transforming Indigenous Mental Health and Wellbeing.

During her career, Dudgeon has taken prominent leadership roles in national and state groups such as the National Mental Health Commission, the Aboriginal and Torres Strait Islander Leadership Group for the state and national Mental Health Commissions in Australia, is co-chair of the National Ministerial Aboriginal Torres Strait Islander Mental Health and Suicide Prevention Advisory Group to the PM&C and Department of Health, and is a member of the Gayaa Dhuwi (Proud Spirit) National Advisory Group which was formed in 2020.

Honours and awards 
Appointed a member (AM) in the General Division of the Order of Australia in 2023
Fellow of the Australian Academy of Health and Medical Sciences in 2021
Australian Psychological Society's President's Award for Distinguished Contribution to Psychology in Australia in 2019/20
Western Australian Patron of the National Justice Reform Initiative
Indigenous Allied Health Australia Lifetime Achievement Award in 2013
Deadly Award for Excellence in Aboriginal and Torres Strait Islander Health in 2013
Inducted Batchelor Institute of Indigenous Tertiary Education Hall of Fame 2009

Selected works 
Dudgeon, P., Bray, A., & Walker, R. (2020). Self-determination and strengths-based Aboriginal and Torres Strait Islander suicide prevention: An emerging evidence-based approach. In A. Page & W. Stritzke (Eds.) Alternatives to suicide: Beyond risk and toward a life worth living (pp. 237–256). Elsevier. This chapter discusses CIA Dudgeons formative Social and Emotional Wellbeing Framework that highlights how colonisation and social determinants impact on Indigenous wellbeing. 
Dudgeon, P., Milroy, J., Calma, T., Luxford, Y., Ring, I., Walker, R., Cox, A., Georgatos, G., & Holland, C. (2016). "Solutions That Work: What the Evidence and Our People Tell Us. Aboriginal and Torres Strait Islander Suicide Prevention Evaluation Project Report." UWA. This report provided a blue print for Indigenous suicide prevention, is cited in most government reports/policies and used extensively by Indigenous community groups.
Dudgeon, P., Calma, T., Brideson, T., & Holland, C. (2016). The Gayaa Dhuwi (Proud Spirit) Declaration - A call to action for Aboriginal and Torres Strait Islander leadership in the Australian mental health system. Advances in Mental Health: Promotion, Prevention and Early Intervention, 14. This paper discusses the role of political and social factors in mental health and highlights the need for a balance of clinical and culturally-informed mental health system responses.
Dudgeon, P., & Walker, R. (2015). Decolonising Australian psychology: Discourses, strategies, and practice. Journal of Social and Political Psychology, 3, 276-297. Articulates social and emotional wellbeing as a culturally appropriate paradigm to describe Aboriginal selfhood, history, social determinants and the need for practice to be culturally safe. 
Dudgeon, P., Milroy, H., & Walker, R. (Eds.). (2014). Working together: Aboriginal and Torres Strait Islander mental health and wellbeing principles and practice. (2nd ed.). Canberra, ACT: Commonwealth of Australia.

References

External links
 

Living people
Australian psychologists
People from Darwin, Northern Territory
Australian women psychologists
Murdoch University alumni
Curtin University alumni
Academic staff of the University of Western Australia
1959 births
Fellows of the Australian Academy of Health and Medical Sciences
Members of the Order of Australia